In organic chemistry, dihydroxybenzenes (benzenediols) are organic compounds in which two hydroxyl groups are substituted onto a benzene ring.  These aromatic compounds are classed as phenols.  There are three structural isomers: 1,2-dihydroxybenzene (the ortho isomer) is commonly known as catechol, 1,3-dihydroxybenzene (the meta isomer) is commonly known as resorcinol, and 1,4-dihydroxybenzene (the para isomer) is commonly known as hydroquinone.
{| class="wikitable"
|-
!Isomer
!ortho
!meta
!para
|-
|Trivial name
|Catechol
|Resorcinol
|Hydroquinone
|-
|IUPAC name
|benzene-1,2-diol
|benzene-1,3-diol
|benzene-1,4-diol
|-
|Other names
|pyrocatechol1,2-dihydroxybenzeneo-dihydroxybenzeneo-benzenediol
|resorcin1,3-dihydroxybenzenem-dihydroxybenzenem-benzenediol
|1,4-dihydroxybenzenep-dihydroxybenzenep-benzenediol
|-
|Structure
|align="center"|
|align="center"|
|align="center"|
|}

All three of these compounds are colorless to white granular solids at room temperature and pressure, but upon exposure to oxygen they may darken.  All three isomers have the chemical formula .

Similar to other phenols, the hydroxyl groups on the aromatic ring of a benzenediol are weakly acidic.

The Dakin oxidation is an organic redox reaction in which an ortho- or para-hydroxylated phenyl aldehyde or ketone reacts with hydrogen peroxide in base to form a benzenediol and a carboxylate. Overall, the carbonyl group is oxidized, and the hydrogen peroxide is reduced.

See also 
 Trihydroxybenzenes
 Tetrahydroxybenzenes
 Pentahydroxybenzene
 Hexahydroxybenzene
 Methylbenzenediols (dihydroxytoluenes)
 3-Methylcatechol (3-methylbenzene-1,2-diol)
 4-Methylcatechol (4-methylbenzene-1,2-diol)
 Orcinol (5-methylbenzene-1,3-diol)
 Methoxyphenols — can be derived from benzenediols by O-methylation
 Guaiacol (2-methoxyphenol, O-Methylcatechol)
 Mequinol (4-Methoxyphenol)
 Dimethoxybenzenes — can be derived from benzenediols by two rounds of O-methylation
 Veratrole (1,2-Dimethoxybenzene)
 1,4-Dimethoxybenzene

References